Marinha de Guerra (Portuguese for navy) may refer to:

 The Angolan Navy
 The Bissau-Guinean Navy
 The Brazilian Navy
 The Mozambique Navy
 The Portuguese Navy

See also 
 Marina (disambiguation)
 Marine (disambiguation)
 Mariner (disambiguation)
 Marines
 Armada (disambiguation)